FUDOFSI, headed by Constant Chevillon (1880–1944), was a federation of independent esoteric orders similar to FUDOSI, but strongly opposed to the other group.

History
FUDOFSI was established in defense of the Orders of Lyon and other societies that were not involved with FUDOSI. FUDOFSI was strongly opposed to FUDOSI, Harvey Spencer Lewis and his organisation Ancient Mystical Order Rosae Crucis (AMORC). Very little information is known about FUDOFSI since neither the organisation or its leader survived the Second World War (in 1944, Constant Chevillon, the head of FUDOFSI, was murdered by the Gestapo).

First meeting
The first meeting of FUDOFSI took place in Paris in February 1939.

List of people present:
 Reuben Swinburne Clymer
 Alfred I. Sharp
 Count Jean de Czarnomsky
 Constant Chevillon
 Henri-Charles Dupont
 Henri Dubois
 Raoul Fructus (former member of the FUDOSI)
 Andre Fayolle
 Nauwelaerts
 Laugenier
 Camille Savoir

Hans Rudolf Hilfiker-Dunn and Arnoldo Krumm-Heller joined FUDOFSI later.

Organisations represented in the first convention of 1939 
 L'Ordre Martiniste-Martineziste de Lyon
 L'Eglise Gnostique Universelle
 Order of Knight Masons Elus Cohen of the Universe
 The Ancient and Primitive Rite of Memphis Mizraim
 Ordre De Saint Graal
 Fraternitas Rosicruciana Antiqua
 Fraternitas Rosae Crucis
 Ordre Kabbalistique De La Rose Croix (different lineage)
 Rite Ecossais Rectifie
 Brotherhood of the Illumined Brethren of the Rose-Croix

The end of FUDOFSI
FUDOFSI ceased to exist at some point during World War II. However, in 1947 some of its members contacted each other and tried to establish a new organisation. Hans-Rudolf Hilfiker and R. Swinburne Clymer (1878–1966) tried to create a Worldwide Alliance of Rosicrucian Orders. In Rio de Janeiro, Clymer successfully merged his organisation with Krumm-Heller's. Hilfiker and Clymer had a meeting on May 7, 1947 and also on June 5, 1948, in Zürich, Switzerland at the hotel Baur au Lac. The Fraternitas Rosae Crucis official biography of Emerson Myron Clymer, son of R. S. Clymer, describes him as Supreme Grand Master of FUDOFSI after his father's death, so it is possible that the Fraternitas Rosae Crucis considers FUDOFSI to have survived later.

See also
 Esotericism
 Freemasonry
 Mysticism
 Occultism
 Rosicrucianism
 Secret society

Rosicrucian organizations
Secret societies